Alexander J. Kravtsov  (October 11, 1893 – 1920)  was a Russian Imperial Army Yesaul during the First World War and a Commander of the Northern Group of the Orenburg Independent Army in the White movement during the Ataman Alexander Dutovs revolt against the Soviet authorities in Orenburg in 1918. He was also one of the Orenburg Army officers who participated in the march across the Turgaj steppe.

Background and early life
Alexander Kravtsov was born in a settlement Vozdvízhenskaya, in a noble family of Kravtsov on October 11, 1893, son of cavalry officer Jacob S. Kravtsov and his wife Marie. In 1914, Kravtsov graduated from Orenburg Military School for the 1st Class and later served in the 14th Orenburg Cossacks Regiment.

Military career
Yesaul Kravtsov received the Gold Sword for Bravery during World War I on the Eastern Front for his personal bravery on the battle field in 1915. After the revolution and the collapse of the front Alexander Kravtsov returned home. Like most of the Cossacks he was an outspoken opponent of the Bolsheviks and joined at the first opportunity to form a partisan detachment. Get under command North Groupe of Orenburg Army during the Ataman Alexander Dutovs revolt against the Soviet authorities in Orenburg in 1918. Assistant Commandant of Orenburg Army HQ (November 1918). He was seriously wounded during the Battle for Orsk on July 29, 1918.

Awards and decorations

See also
 White movement
 Alexander Dutov
 Russian Civil War

References

1893 births
1920 deaths
Recipients of the Order of St. Anna, 2nd class
Recipients of the Order of St. Vladimir
Cossacks from the Russian Empire
Anti-communists from the Russian Empire
Russian people of World War I
People of the Russian Civil War
White movement people
Recipients of the Gold Sword for Bravery
Recipients of the Order of St. Anna, 3rd class
Recipients of the Order of St. Anna, 4th class